The Last Communist is a 2006 Malaysian film described by director Amir Muhammad as a "semi-musical documentary". It is inspired by the leader of the disbanded Malayan Communist Party, Chin Peng and the Malayan Emergency (1948–1960) during which more than 10,000 Malayan and British troops and civilians lost their lives. The film was banned from screening in Malaysia by the government's Home Affairs Ministry.

The film features interviews with people in the towns in which Peng lived from birth to national independence, interspersed with songs that are fashioned after propaganda films.

The Last Communist made its world premiere at the 2006 Berlin Film Festival. It has also been shown at the Seattle International Film Festival, the London Film Festival, the Singapore International Film Festival and the Hong Kong International Film Festival, but has never been publicly shown in its home country. The film has been uploaded in its entirety on YouTube.

See also
 History of Malaysia

References

Further reading 
Bonura, C. (2021). The What-Has-Been and the Now of a Communist Past in Malaya in the Films of Amir Muhammad. Positions: Asia Critique, 29(1), 47-65.

External links
 
 
 The Last Communist - Director Amir Muhammad's blog
 Edited footage of 21 May screening. - English and Malay without subtitles.

2006 films
Films about communism
Films about the Malayan Emergency
Malaysian documentary films
Malaysian political films
Malay-language films
English-language Malaysian films
Chinese-language Malaysian films
Tamil-language Malaysian films
Films directed by Amir Muhammad
Films produced by Amir Muhammad
Malaysian independent films
2006 independent films
Films with screenplays by Amir Muhammad